Lady Sings the Blues is a 1972 American biographical drama film directed by Sidney J. Furie about jazz singer Billie Holiday, loosely based on her 1956 autobiography which, in turn, took its title from Holiday's songs. It was produced by Motown Productions for Paramount Pictures. Diana Ross, in her feature film debut, portrayed Holiday, alongside a cast including Billy Dee Williams, Richard Pryor, James T. Callahan and Scatman Crothers. The film was nominated for five Academy Awards in 1973, including Best Actress in a Leading Role for Diana Ross.

Plot
In New York City 1936, Eleanora Fagan, aka Billie Holiday, is arrested on a drug charge.

In a flashback to 1928, Billie is working as a housekeeper in a brothel in Baltimore. When she returns to her aunt's house, she is home alone and is raped by a man who followed her home from the brothel. She runs away to her mother Sadie, who sets up a job cleaning for another brothel in the Harlem section of New York. The brothel is run by arrogant and selfish owner Lorraine, who pays Billie very little money. Eventually, Billie tires of scrubbing floors and becomes a prostitute, but later quits and returns to a nightclub to unsuccessfully audition to become a showgirl. After "Piano Man" accompanies Billie when she sings "All of Me", club owner Jerry books her as a singer in the show.

Billie's debut begins unsuccessfully until Louis McKay arrives and gives her a fifty dollar tip. Billie takes the money and sings "Them There Eyes". Billie takes a liking to Louis and begins a relationship with him. Eventually she is discovered by Harry and Reg Hanley, who sign her as a soloist for their southern tour in hopes of landing a radio network gig. During the tour, Billie witnesses the aftermath of the lynching of an African-American man, which presses her to record the controversial song "Strange Fruit". The harsh experiences on the tour result in Billie taking drugs, which Harry supplies after Billie collapses on stage. One night when Billie is performing, Louis comes to see Billie. In her dressing room, Louis notices her needle marks, knows that she is doing drugs, and tells her she is going home with him. Billie promises to stay off the drugs if Louis stays with her.

In New York, Reg and Louis arrange Billie's radio debut, but the station does not call her up to the stage to sing; the radio sponsors, a soap company, objected to her race. The group heads to Cafe Manhattan to drown their sorrows. Billie has too much to drink and asks Harry for drugs, saying that she does not want her family to know that the radio show upset her. He refuses and she throws her drink in his face. She is ready to leave, but Louis has arranged for her to sing at the Cafe, a club where she once aspired to sing. She obliges with one song but refuses an encore, leaving the club in urgent need of a fix. Louis, suspicious that Billie has broken her promise, takes her back to his home but refuses to allow her access to the bathroom or her kit. She fights Louis for it, pulling a razor on him. Louis leaves her to shoot up, telling her he does not want her there when he returns.

Billie returns to the Harlem nightclub, where her drug use intensifies until she hears of the death of Sadie. Billie checks herself into a drug clinic, but because she cannot afford her treatment the hospital secretly calls Louis, who comes to see her and agrees to pay her bills without her knowledge. Impressed with the initiative she has taken to straighten herself out, Louis proposes to her at the hospital. Just as things are looking up, Billie is arrested for possession of narcotics and removed from the clinic.

In prison, Billie goes through crippling withdrawal. Louis brings the doctor from the hospital to treat her, but she is incoherent. He puts a ring on her finger to remind her of his promise to marry her. When she finishes her prison sentence, Billie returns home and tells her friends that she does not want to sing anymore.

Billie marries Louis and pledges not to continue her career, but the lure of performing is too strong and she returns to singing with Louis as her manager. Unfortunately, her felony conviction has stripped her of her Cabaret Card, which would allow her to sing in NYC nightclubs. To restore public confidence and regain her license, Billie agrees to a cross-country tour. Billie's career takes off on the nightclub circuit.

Louis leaves for New York to arrange a comeback performance for Billie at Carnegie Hall. Despondent at Louis' absence and the never-ending stream of venues, Billie asks Piano Man to pawn the ring Louis gave her in exchange for drugs. While they are high that evening, Piano Man's drug connections arrive; he neither pawned the ring nor paid for the drugs. Piano Man is killed by the dealers. Within the hour, Louis and her promoter call Billie with news that they got Carnegie Hall. Louis returns to find a very fragile Billie who is traumatized and has fallen back into drugs. Louis takes her back to New York.

Billie plays to a packed house at Carnegie Hall. Her encore, "God Bless the Child", is overlaid with newspaper clippings highlighting subsequent events: the concert fails to sway the commission to restore her license; subsequent appeals are denied; she is later re-arrested on drug charges and finally dies when she is 44. Nevertheless, the Carnegie triumph is frozen in time.

Cast

Release

Home Media
The film was released on VHS and DVD on November 8, 2005. The film debuted on the Blu-ray format for the first time on February 23, 2021.

Reception

Box office
The film earned an estimated $9,050,000 in North American rentals in 1973. Its overall domestic box office totaled $19,726,490.

Critical reception
Vincent Canby of The New York Times described Ross as "an actress of exceptional beauty and wit, who is very much involved in trying to make a bad movie work ... her only apparent limitations are those imposed on her by a screenplay and direction seemingly designed to turn a legitimate legend into a whopper of a cliché." Variety wrote that "for the bulk of general audiences, the film serves as a very good screen debut vehicle for Diana Ross, supported strongly by excellent casting, handsome '30s physical values, and a script which is far better in dialog than structure." Roger Ebert gave the film three stars out of four, writing that Ross had given "one of the great performances of 1972" and observing that the film "has most of the clichés we expect—but do we really mind clichés in a movie like this? I don't think so." Gene Siskel of the Chicago Tribune also awarded three out of four stars, writing, "The fact that 'Lady Sings the Blues' is a failure as a biography of legendary jazz singer Billie Holiday doesn't mean it can't be an entertaining movie. And it is just that—entertaining—because of an old fashioned grand dame performance by Diana Ross, late of the pop-rock scene, in the title role." Charles Champlin of the Los Angeles Times wrote that Ross gave "one of the truly fine screen performances, full of power and pathos and enormously engaging and sympathetic." Pauline Kael of The New Yorker wrote that "when the movie was over I wrote 'I love it' on my pad of paper ... Factually it's a fraud, but emotionally it delivers. It has what makes movies work for a mass audience: easy pleasure, tawdry electricity, personality—great quantities of personality." Tom Milne of The Monthly Film Bulletin wrote that Ross did "a remarkable pastiche job on the tone and timbre of Billie Holiday's voice, [but] misses the elegant, almost literary wit of her phrasing," and found the presentation of Holiday's life story "offensively simplistic."

The film holds a 67% rating on Rotten Tomatoes based on 18 reviews.

Awards and honors

The film was also screened at the 1973 Cannes Film Festival, but was not entered into the main competition.

The film is recognized by American Film Institute in these lists:
 2004: AFI's 100 Years...100 Songs:	
 "God Bless the Child" – Nominated

Soundtrack
Motown released a hugely successful soundtrack double-album of Ross' recordings of Billie Holiday songs from the film, also titled Lady Sings the Blues. The album went to number one on the Billboard Top LP's & Tape chart, for the week-ending dates of April 7 and 14, 1973.

See also
 Lady Day at Emerson's Bar and Grill – A 1986 play and 2016 television movie, starring Audra McDonald.
 The United States vs. Billie Holiday – A 2021 biopic of Billie Holiday, starring Andra Day.
 List of American films of 1972

References

External links
 
 
 
 
 

1972 films
1972 drama films
1970s American films
1970s biographical drama films
1970s English-language films
African-American biographical dramas
Biographical films about singers
Cultural depictions of Billie Holiday
Films about drugs
Films about the Ku Klux Klan
Films based on autobiographies
Films directed by Sidney J. Furie
Films scored by Michel Legrand
Films set in the 1920s
Films set in 1928
Films set in the 1930s
Films set in 1936
Films set in New York City
Films shot in Los Angeles
Jazz films
Motown Productions films
Paramount Pictures films